Eugene Junie Lewis (born January 11, 1966) is a retired American basketball player. He was drafted by the Utah Jazz in the second round of the 1989 NBA Draft out of the University of South Alabama.

College career
During the 1988-89 season, Lewis averaged 17.7 points, 6.7 rebounds, and 5.9 assists.

During their playing days at South Alabama, Lewis and fellow guard Jeff Hodge were usually referred to as "peanut butter and jelly", respectively. Lewis's number (11) was retired alongside Hodge's in a ceremony on January 20, 2018.

References

External links
Junie Lewis on thedraftreview.com
Junie Lewis Player Profile, South Alabama, NCAA Stats, Awards - RealGM
Former South Alabama star Junie Lewis rebounds from tough life to inspire others AL.com

1966 births
Living people
American men's basketball players
Basketball players from Pennsylvania
Guards (basketball)
Oklahoma City Cavalry players
Pittsburgh Panthers men's basketball players
South Alabama Jaguars men's basketball players
Utah Jazz draft picks